Bobongko is an Austronesian language of the Togian Islands off the eastern peninsula of the island of Sulawesi. It belongs to the Saluan–Banggai branch of the Celebic subgroup.

References

Saluan–Banggai languages
Languages of Sulawesi